Avenida Amílcar Cabral is an avenue in the Plateau, the historic centre of Praia, Santiago island, Cape Verde. It is the neighborhood's longest street and the main artery of the city centre. Formerly named Rua Sá da Bandeira after 19th century Portuguese politician Sá da Bandeira, it was renamed after Cape Verdean independence in honour of Amílcar Cabral, leader of the independence movement of Cape Verde and Guinea-Bissau. It runs south to north in the western part of the Plateau, parallel to Rua 5 de Julho, Rua Serpa Pinto and Avenida Andrade Corvo. It forms the west side of Praça Alexandre Albuquerque. 

Notable buildings along the street:
Palace of Culture "Ildo Lobo", at Praça Alexandre Albuquerque
Banco Interatlântico, at Praça Alexandre Albuquerque
townhouse "Serbam"
townhouse "Feba"
Banco de Cabo Verde, Cape Verde's central bank
the Municipal Market
Liceu Domingos Ramos, at Praça Domingos Ramos

References

Plateau of Praia
Streets in Praia